Groveland is an unincorporated community in Floyd Township, Putnam County, in the U.S. state of Indiana.

History
Groveland was laid out in 1854. A post office was established at Groveland in 1852, and remained in operation until it was discontinued in 1905.

Geography

References

Unincorporated communities in Putnam County, Indiana
Unincorporated communities in Indiana